5 is an album by German industrial metal band Megaherz. It was released in 2004 and re-released in the United States in 2006. It's the first and the only album by this band to feature Mathias "Jablonski" Elsholz as the lead vocalist.

Track listing

References

External links
 5 lyrics and official English translations
 Official Megaherz site

2004 albums
2006 albums
Megaherz albums